Frank Watene (born 15 February 1977) is a former professional rugby league footballer who played as a  or  forward in the 1990s, 2000s and 2010s. He played at representative level for Tonga (1995 Rugby League World Cup squad), New Zealand Junior Kiwis (1996), New Zealand Māori, and at club level for Counties Manukau Heroes, Auckland Warriors (Heritage № 57), Wakefield Trinity Wildcats (Heritage № 1146), Hull Kingston Rovers (Heritage №), Castleford Tigers (Heritage № 827), Dewsbury Rams and Halifax (Heritage № 1242) at club level.

Personal
Frank is the older brother of rugby league footballer, Adam Watene.

Early years
Watene started his career with the Otahuhu Leopards in the Auckland Rugby League competition, before being signed by the new Auckland Warriors club in 1994. He made his first grade début in 1998. Watene toured with the New Zealand Māori rugby league team in 1998 and played for them in the 1997 Oceania Cup and against Great Britain in 1999.

England
Watene currently plays for Halifax in the second division of English rugby league called the Championship. Is of Tongan and New Zealand Māori descent 'Frank the Tank' signed for Halifax at the start of the 2007 rugby league season after playing for Dewsbury Rams in 2006 and helping them to win their National League two promotion. Watene was named in the dream team after an impressive year. Watene's usual position is Prop Forward however due to his sheer size Watene usually starts off the matches on the substitutes bench and will come onto the field of play later in the match, when his team need a boost of energy which he provides in the form of strong running.
In September 2007 Frank signed a one-year extension to his current Halifax contract, after a highly impressive season.

References

External links
Halifax profile
Frank Watene from Hull KR signs for Castleford
Profile at thecastlefordtigers.co.uk
A short video about rugby league starring Frank Watene
Picture of Frank celebrating his try for Halifax against Widnes Vikings in the final game of Halifax's 2007 national league one campaign
Picture of Frank on the charge against Whitehaven RLFC earlier on in Halifax's 2007 season

1977 births
Living people
Auckland rugby league team players
Castleford Tigers players
Counties Manukau rugby league team players
Dewsbury Rams players
Halifax R.L.F.C. players
Hull Kingston Rovers players
Junior Kiwis players
New Zealand Māori rugby league players
New Zealand Māori rugby league team players
New Zealand sportspeople of Tongan descent
New Zealand rugby league players
New Zealand Warriors players
Otahuhu Leopards players
Rugby league props
Rugby league second-rows
Tonga national rugby league team players
Wakefield Trinity players